Zhengdian is a town in Laoling, Dezhou, in northwestern Shandong province, China. , it has 115 villages under its administration.

References

Township-level divisions of Shandong
Laoling